= A Theory of Race =

2009 non-fiction book

- Author: Joshua Glasgow
- Language: English
- Genre: Non-fiction
- Publisher: Routledge
- Publication date: 2009
- ISBN: 978-0-415-99072-1

A Theory Of Race is a 2009 book by Joshua Glasgow. It argues that there is no such thing as race and so that all claims with a racial basis are false.
